Jamie Ann Quisumbing Angeles (born March 11, 1990) professionally known as Janna Dominguez, is a Filipino actress, host, and comedian. She is best known for portraying the role of Maria in Pepito Manaloto.

Career 
Dominguez started out as one of the co-hosts in Wowowee. She joined Pinoy Fear Factor as a Participante.

Dominguez was a member of ABS-CBN's elite circle of homegrown talents, Star Magic. She did not renew her contract to do projects on ABS-CBN's rival station, GMA Network. She supposed to be a freelance actress but later decided to sign an exclusive contract with GMA Network in 2010 to be a regular host and performer of I Laugh Sabado that aired on the same network's sister channel Q. Dominguez also served as the guest co-host of Take Me Out. The same year, Dominguez joined the ensemble cast of Pepito Manaloto as Maria, one of the Manaloto family's resident housemaids. She quickly became recognizable, owing to her exposure in the sitcom.

Dominguez also joined the cast of Endless Love. She supposed to star in a Sine Novela installment Bakit Kay Tagal ng Sandali?, but it was shelved.

Personal life

Filmography

Television

Movies

References

External links

1990 births
Living people
People from Quezon City
Actresses from Metro Manila
Filipino television personalities
Filipino television variety show hosts
Participants in Philippine reality television series
Filipino television actresses
Filipino women comedians
ABS-CBN personalities
Star Magic
GMA Network personalities